Muir Inlet is an inlet in Glacier Bay, U.S.A. Muir Inlet heads in Muir Glacier, and extends for   south to Glacier Bay,  NW of Hoonah, Alaska Muir Inlet is separated from Chilkat Inlet and Lynn Canal by Chilkat Range. Muir Inlet has several glacier's terminuses besides Muir Glacier, most prominent are Casement Glacier, McBride Glacier and Riggs Glacier. In the west lies the Wachusett Inlet and in the east the Adam's Inlet.

Muir Inlet was named in 1883 by U.S. Coast and Geodetic Survey (USC&GS) for John Muir, (1838–1914), who visited this area in 1890.
Muir Inlet is popular kayaking destination.

References

External links

 Marine Benthic Habitat Mapping of Muir Inlet, Glacier Bay National Park and Preserve, Alaska With an Evaluation of the Coastal and Marine Ecological Classification Standard III By Luke D. Trusel, Guy R. Cochrane, Lisa L. Etherington, Ross D. Powell, and Larry A. Mayer. U.S. Geological Survey Scientific Investigations Map 3122

Inlets of Alaska
Fjords of Alaska
Bodies of water of Hoonah–Angoon Census Area, Alaska